Candy was an Afro-Barbadian slave, under the ownership of Margaret Hawkes of Salem Town, who was accused of witchcraft during the Salem witch trials. On July 1, 1692, John Putnam, Jr. and Thomas Putnam accused both Hawkes and Candy of tormenting Ann Putnam, Jr., Mary Walcott, and Mary Warren. Upon interrogation, she "admitted" to being a witch, but turned on her owner, claiming that Hawkes had turned her into a witch, and forced her to sign the devil's book. Despite this admission, she was found not guilty and was released. There is no record of Margaret Hawkes having been arrested. Unlike many of the other accused married women, who were referred to as "Goodwife", Margaret was addressed with the honorific "Mrs.", which indicates she was of a higher social class.

When she was asked how she and her owner tormented the girls, she volunteered to demonstrate the procedure. She returned with some poppets, and when they were manipulated by pinching, heat and water, the afflicted girls responded in kind.

Her examination records her testimony in broken English, which indicates she was probably newly exposed to the English language.

She was one of three slaves, along with Tituba and Mary Black, to be accused during the hysteria of 1692.

References

Date of birth unknown
17th-century African people
American people of Barbadian descent
17th-century American slaves
Colonial American women
People accused of witchcraft
People of the Salem witch trials
American women slaves